Raivo Paavo (born 22 May 1946 in Lüganuse Parish, Virumaa) is an Estonian politician. He was a member of VIII Riigikogu.

References

Living people
1946 births
Members of the Riigikogu, 1995–1999
Members of the Riigikogu, 1999–2003
Members of the Riigikogu, 2003–2007